Avalon Equity Partners is a New York-based investment group that invested in media, communications and information services industries. In 1999, it formed its first fund from private individuals and the Small Business Administration and in 2006 it formed an exclusive partnership with a leading hedge fund to provide its financial backing.

Established in 1999, the first fund invested in media, communications and information services industries.

Fund portfolio subsidiaries

Broadcasting
Route 81 Radio
WAZL
WCOJ
WHYL
WZMF
WTRW
WCDL
WCBF
WENI
WCBA
WGMM

Cable TV
Rocky Mountain Cable
US Cable
Uvision
Willamette Broadband

Services
Smart City
Insight Training Solutions

Financial history
Avalon Equity Partners focused on buyouts and investments in both public and private media, communication and business services companies through two investment companies, Avalon Media Investments and an SBIC Fund.

Avalon Media Investments focused on investing in media companies across the capital structure including private equity, secondary and new issue debt. It was formed through a unique relationship with a leading hedge fund which provided financial backing. It also evaluated certain opportunities on behalf of the hedge fund and its investors. The SBIC Fund focused on investing in smaller privately held media companies primarily in the broadcasting space. It was licensed by the Small Business Administration (SBA).

References

Financial services companies established in 1999
Investment management companies of the United States
1999 establishments in New York (state)